Palaic is an extinct Indo-European language, attested in cuneiform tablets in Bronze Age Hattusa, the capital of the Hittites. Palaic, which was apparently spoken mainly in northern Anatolia, is generally considered to be one of four primary sub-divisions of the Anatolian languages, alongside Hittite (central Anatolia), Luwic (southern Anatolia) and Lydian (western Anatolia).

Its name in Hittite is palaumnili, or "of the people of Pala"; Pala was probably to the northwest of the Hittite core area, so in the northwest of present mainland Turkey. The region was overrun by the Kaskians in the 15th century BC, and the language likely went out of daily use at that time.

Sources 
The entire corpus of Palaic spans only CTH 751-754 in Emmanuel Laroche's  catalog of Hittite texts; in addition Hittite texts elsewhere cite passages in Palaic in reference to the weather god Zaparwa (Hittite Ziparwa), the leading God of the land of Pala. In particular, CTH 750, a festival in Hittite for Ziparwa and associated deities, includes passages stating, "The Old Woman speaks the words of the bread in Palaic," or alternately "the words of the meal," though no Palaic passages are quoted. The Palaic-language texts are all from a religious context, with ritual and mythological content. In addition to Zaparwa, the Palaumnili-speakers worshipped a sun deity Tiyaz (Luwian Tiwaz), the Hattian goddess Kataḫzip/wuri, and several others.

Morphology 
In terms of its morphology, Palaic is a fairly typical specimen of Indo-European. Old Hittite has the genitive singular suffix -aš circa 1600 BC (compare Proto-Indo-European *-os); where Cuneiform Luwian instead uses the -ašša/i- adjectival suffix. Palaic, on the northern border of both, like later Hieroglyphic Luwian has both an -aš genitive and an -aša- adjectival suffix. Palaic also shows the same gender distinction as seen in Hittite, i.e. animate vs. inanimate; and has similar pronoun forms. It is considered to have had a "high number of attestations of the suffix -ina," all of which were transitive and shared common innovations with Luwian not present Old Hittite suggesting a prior Luwian-Palaic linguistic complex. It has been characterized as "more conservative than Hittite" and heavily influenced by the Hattic language, though caution is prescribed for the latter assertion given the paucity of available materials.

References

Further reading

External links
 
Catalog of Hittite Texts
Genitive Case and Possessive Adjective in Anatolian by Craig Melchert

Anatolian languages
Language
Languages attested from the 2nd millennium BC
Languages extinct in the 14th century BC